Narcissus obesus is a species of the genus Narcissus (Daffodils) in the family Amaryllidaceae. It is classified in Section Bulbocodium. It is native to Spain, Portugal and Morocco.

Description 
Flowers solitary, horizontal to erect, floral tube and tepals yellow.

Distribution and habitat 
Rocky cliffs, dunes and meadows, calcareous or acid soil.

References

External links 
  Pacific Bulb Society
 Alpine Garden Society

obesus
Garden plants
Flora of Spain